The 2024 U Sports Men's Volleyball Championship is scheduled to be held March 15–17, 2024, in Kingston, Ontario, to determine a national champion for the 2023–24 U Sports men's volleyball season.

Host
The tournament is scheduled to be hosted by Queen's University at the Athletics & Recreation Centre (ARC) on the school's campus. This would be the second time that Queen's has hosted the tournament with the most recent occurring in 2012.

Scheduled teams
Canada West Representative
OUA Representative
RSEQ Representative
Host (Queen's Gaels)
Four additional berths

Championship bracket

Consolation bracket

References

External links 
 Tournament Web Site

U Sports volleyball
2024 in men's volleyball
Queen's University at Kingston